

Band Information 
 Terri Hendrix - vocals, harmonica, acoustic guitar, papoose, mandolin 
 Lloyd Maines - acoustic, electric, and steel guitars, papoose, mandolin, wissenborn, dulcimer, dobro, background vocals
 Glenn Fukunaga -bass
 Paul Pearcy - drums, percussion
 Riley Osbourn - keyboards
 Adam Odor - accordion
 Marcus Hummon – accordion, baritone mandolin
 John Mills - saxophone
 Sara Hickman – background vocals on "Consider Me"

Producers: Lloyd Maines & Terri Hendrix

Track listing 
 Goodbye Charlie Brown
 Spinning Off
 I Found the Lions
 Truth is Strange
 From Another Planet
 Long Time Coming
 Consider Me
 Night Wolves
 The Fact Is
 The Ring
 Prayer for my Friends

2002 albums
Terri Hendrix albums